Coffin bread, also known as coffin lid or coffin board (Taiwanese Hokkien: kuann-tshâ-pang), is a Taiwanese bread bowl which originated in Tainan.

History
Coffin bread has been sold at night markets in Tainan and Taipei since at least the 1940s. It became popular with US troops stationed in Taiwan.

Description
Coffin bread starts as a thick Texas toast style slab of white bread. The bread is hollowed out and either toasted or fried before it is filled with a creamy stew of chicken, seafood, tripe, or mushroom. It is then topped with a piece of toasted or fried bread, creating the "coffin" look.

See also
 Taiwanese cuisine
 Bunny chow

References

Taiwanese cuisine
Breads